The Aïgue Longue (or Aygue Longue) is a left tributary of the Luy de Béarn, at Mazerolles, Pyrénées-Atlantiques, in the Southwest of France.

Name 
Its name means 'long water (stream)'.

Geography 
The Aïgue Longue rises in the moor of Pont-Long in the north of Pau.

A dam near Mazerolles forms a reservoir named Lac de L'Aigue Longue.

Main tributaries 
 (L) Lata
 (R) Bruscos

References

Rivers of France
Rivers of Pyrénées-Atlantiques
Rivers of Nouvelle-Aquitaine